Andrew Devon Terrell (born July 25, 1991) is an American football coach who is the passing game coordinator and wide receivers coach for the Arizona Cardinals of the National Football League (NFL). He previously served as an assistant coach for the Washington Commanders, Carolina Panthers, University of Michigan and Virginia Tech.

He played college football at Stanford, where he earned two All-Pac-12 honorable mentions as a punt returner.

Early years
Terrell was a four-year letterman at wide receiver and punt returner at Stanford University from 2009 to 2012, earning honorable mention All-Pac-12 as a returner three times. He was a part of four consecutive bowl teams with the Cardinal, and was Stanford's leading receiver in 2012, when the team finished with a 12-2 record and won both the Pac-12 championship and the Rose Bowl.

Coaching career

Early career
Terrell began his coaching career at Virginia Tech in 2014 as a graduate assistant at the request of Hokies wide receivers coach Aaron Moorehead, who was a graduate assistant at Stanford when Terrell was playing. He went on to join the coaching staff at Michigan as a graduate assistant in 2015 under his former college coach Jim Harbaugh.

Carolina Panthers
Terrell was hired as an offensive quality control coach for the Carolina Panthers on February 13, 2018.

Washington Football Team / Commanders
Terrell joined the Washington Football Team in 2020 as their assistant wide receivers coach. He was promoted to wide receivers coach in 2021 after Jim Hostler was promoted to senior offensive assistant.

References

External links
 
 Stanford Cardinal bio

1991 births
Living people
Carolina Panthers coaches
American football wide receivers
Coaches of American football from Arizona
Michigan Wolverines football coaches
Players of American football from Arizona
Sportspeople from Chandler, Arizona
Sportspeople from Mesa, Arizona
Stanford Cardinal football players
Virginia Tech Hokies football coaches
Washington Commanders coaches
Washington Football Team coaches